Michael, Mike, or Mick Ward may refer to:

Entertainment
Micheal Ward (born 1997), Jamaican-born British actor
Michael Ward (actor) (1909–1997), British actor
Michael Ward (musician) (born 1967), American guitarist
Michael "Mudcat" Ward, American blues bassist, pianist and songwriter 
Mike Ward (comedian) (born 1973), Canadian comedian, actor and writer from Quebec
Mike Ward (singer) (born 1990), British musical artist

Politics
Michael Ward (British politician) (1931–2009), British Labour Party politician
Michael Ward (Irish politician) (1683–1759), Irish MP for Down and Bangor
Michael E. Ward, American civil servant and politician
Mike Ward (New Zealand politician) (born 1942), New Zealand Green Party politician
Mike Ward (American politician) (born 1951), U.S. Congressman from Kentucky and radio talk show host

Sports
Michael Ward (cricketer) (born 1971), British sportsman
Michael Ward (mountaineer) (1925–2005), British doctor and mountaineer
Michael Ward (rugby league) (born 1991), Ireland international rugby league footballer
Micky Ward (born 1965), American professional boxer and former WBU champion

Other
Michael Ward (bishop) (died 1681), Irish theologian and prelate
Michael Ward (economist) (1939–2008), British economist and statistician
Michael Ward (mountaineer) (1925–2005), English surgeon and expedition doctor on the 1953 first ascent of Everest
Michael Ward (scholar) (born 1968), C. S. Lewis scholar
Michael D. Ward (1948–2021), American political scientist and academic
Michael Edward Ward (1845–1921), Irish-Australian detective
Michael Francis Ward (1845–1881), Irish physician
Michael J. Ward, American CEO and president of CSX Corporation
Michael Moses Ward, survivor of the 1985 MOVE bombing in Philadelphia, Pennsylvania
 Michael Ward, managing director of department store Harrods

See also
Jeremy Michael Ward (1976–2003), American sound technician and vocal operator
Lothar Michael Ward (died 1978), commercial diver killed in Star Canopus diving accident